Melaleuca phoidophylla is a plant in the myrtle family, Myrtaceae and is endemic to the south-west of Western Australia. It is distinguished by its leaf arrangement, small raised blisters on the leaves and heads of white or cream flowers on the ends of the branches in spring.

Description
The leaves have small blisters and in cross section are crescent moon-shaped to semicircular.

The flowers are cream to white, sometimes pinkish and arranged in heads on the ends of branches which continue to grow after flowering. There are five bundles of stamens around the flower, each with 7 to 11 stamens.

Taxonomy and naming
Melaleuca phoidophylla was first formally described in 1999 by Lyndley Craven in Australian Systematic Botany from a specimen collected near Pingaring. The specific epithet (phoidophylla) is derived from ancient Greek words  meaning "blister" and  meaning "leaf", referring to the raised blisters on the leaves of this species.

Distribution and habitat
This melaleuca occurs in and between the Katanning, Boorabbin and Salmon Gums districts in the Avon Wheatbelt, Coolgardie, Mallee and Murchison biogeographic regions. It grows in sandy or clayey soils near lakes and areas that are seasonally flooded.

Conservation
Melaleuca phoidophylla is listed as "not threatened" by the Government of Western Australia Department of Parks and Wildlife.

References

phoidophylla
Plants described in 1999
Endemic flora of Western Australia
Taxa named by Lyndley Craven